Events pertaining to world affairs in 2023, national politics, public policy, government, world economics, and international business, that took place in various nations, regions, organizations, around the world in 2023.

January 
 January 1
All works published in 1927, except for some sound recordings, entered the public domain in the United States.
Lula da Silva is sworn in as president of Brazil.

January 3
2023 Speaker of the United States House of Representatives election: For the first time in 100 years, it takes the House more than one round to elect a speaker.

January 5
Death and funeral of Pope Benedict XVI: The funeral of Pope emeritus Benedict XVI, who died on December 31, 2022, is held and is presided over by Pope Francis. His body is then interred in the crypt underneath St Peter's Basilica.

 January 7
2023 Speaker of the United States House of Representatives election: In the early hours of January 7, after 15 rounds of voting, Republican Kevin McCarthy is elected speaker, when six Republicans opposed to McCarthy vote present, lowering the threshold needed to be elected.

 January 8
2023 Brazilian Congress attack: Pro-Bolsonaro protesters storm the Brazilian Congress, Supreme Court and Presidential Palace.

January 17
Gambian Vice-President, Badara Joof, dies in India.

 January 18
2023 Brovary helicopter crash: A helicopter crashes into a kindergarten in Brovary, Kyiv, killing 14 people. Among the dead is Ukrainian Minister of Internal Affairs, Denys Monastyrskyy, his deputy Yevhen Yenin and another member of the Interior Ministry Yurii Lubkovych. 
Vietnamese President Nguyễn Xuân Phúc resigns over corruption scandals in his government. Vice President Võ Thị Ánh Xuân becomes acting president, until the election of a new president by the National Assembly.

January 19
2023 French pension reform strikes: Mass protests and strikes break out in France after the government proposed raising the retirement age from 62 to 64. 

January 20
Gabon's foreign minister, Michaël Moussa Adamo, dies, after suffering a heart attack in a cabinet meeting.

January 24
Israeli Interior and Health Minister, Aryeh Deri, is dismissed after the Supreme Court invalidates his appointment.

January 25
The  Prime Minister of New Zealand, Jacinda Ardern, leaves office after announcing her resignation on January 19. She is succeeded by Chris Hipkins, who was elected unopposed as the new leader of the Labour Party on January 22.

January 26
2023 Jenin killings: A raid by the IDF on a refugee camp in Jenin leaves 7 Palestinian militants and 3 civilians dead.

January 27
Killing of Tyre Nichols: Video showing the killing of an unarmed black man, Tyre Nichols, by five black police officers is released by the Memphis Police Department.

January 29
Premiership of Rishi Sunak: Nadhim Zahawi, Chairman of the Conservative Party, is fired after being fined by HMRC over his tax affairs.

February
 February 1
Manuela Roka Botey becomes the first female Prime Minister of Equatorial Guinea.

 February 3
Bulgaria's National Assembly is dissolved after a government could not be formed. New elections are called for April 2.

February 5
2023 Cypriot presidential election: In the first round of presidential elections no candidate receives more than 50% of the vote. The two candidates who received the most votes in this round, Nikos Christodoulides and Andreas Mavroyiannis, advance to the second round, which will be held on February 12.
2023 Ecuadorian constitutional referendum: Voters in Ecuador reject constitutional changes proposed by President Guillermo Lasso.
2023 Monegasque general election: The Monegasque National Union wins all 24 seats in the National Council.

February 6
A series of earthquakes in Turkey and Syria kill around 51,000 people, including two members of Turkey's parliament, Yakup Taş and Sıtkı Güvenç.

February 7
2023 British cabinet reshuffle:

February 8
South Korean Interior Minister Lee Sang-min is suspended from office pending an investigation into his handling of the Seoul Halloween crowd crush.

February 12
NATO Secretary General Jens Stoltenberg announces that he will not seek reelection and will leave office in October.

February 15
Scotland's longest serving First Minister, Nicola Sturgeon, announces her resignation after eight years in office.
The President of the World Bank, David Malpass, announces that he will step down on June 30.

March
 March 10
 CCP General Secretary Xi Jinping is re-elected to an unprecedented third term as the President of China.

References

2023 in politics
Political timelines of the 2020s by year
Politics by year
2023 in international relations